Dalarö fortress is a fortification located just south of Dalarö. The current structure was built by Charles X Gustav of Sweden in 1656.

History
It was built to replace an old structure from 1623. In 1683 the fortress was renovated by Erik Dahlbergh and the renovations were completed in 1698. The fortress has never been under siege. Russian forces avoided it in 1719. It was decommissioned by the military in 1854. Today the building is a museum and it contains a restaurant.

Commandants
Joachim von Rohr (1678–1757), commander of the Dalarö fortress from 1743 to 1757.

References

External links
Dalarö fortress at Flickr

Buildings and structures in Stockholm County
Forts in Sweden
Museums in Stockholm County
Star forts